The Meteor is an Indian Cruiser-style motorcycle manufactured by Royal Enfield in India. The model was developed by engineers based at Royal Enfield’s two state-of-the-art technical centres, in Chennai. The Meteor is a direct replacement to Thunderbird 350.

Design

Engine
Royal Enfield developed the Meteor codenamed JD1. The 349cc long-stroke single-cylinder engine is now air and oil-cooled and the traditional pushrods were replaced by an overhead cam. The engine produces 20 horsepower at 6,100rpm and 27Nm of torque at 4,000rpm and is paired to a five-speed constant mesh transmission. The bike has a power-to-weight ratio of 105.75 hp/tonne. The engine design also includes a balancer shaft to repress the vibrations.

Frame and Chassis
The Meteor comes with a twin-tube spine frame, as opposed to the single downtube frame, which most of its contemporaries in the company's line-up have. The suspension is telescopic in front while in the rear is twin-tube emulsion shock absorbers. Front forks are 41mm with 130mm travel and the rear suspension has six-step adjustable preload.

The stock tires of the bike are 100/90-19 inch at front and 140/70-17 inch at the rear. The motorcycle has a 300 mm disc with a dual-piston floating caliper at the front and a 270 mm single-piston floating caliper disc at rear.

The bike also features an all-new semi-digital instrument cluster and a tripper screen in a separate pod which displays turn by turn navigation.

2022 Update
Three new colors are available.

See also
List of Royal Enfield motorcycles
Royal Enfield

References

External links
 Meteor 350 official page

Motorcycles of India
Cruiser motorcycles
Meteor